Hurricane Elida was the first hurricane of the 2002 Pacific hurricane season to reach Category 5 strength on the Saffir-Simpson Hurricane Scale. Forming on July 23 from a tropical wave, the storm rapidly intensified from a tropical depression into a Category 5 hurricane in two days, and lasted for only six hours at that intensity before weakening. It was one of only sixteen known hurricanes in the East Pacific east of the International Date Line to have reached such an intensity. Although heavy waves were able to reach the Mexican coastline, no damages or casualties were reported in relation to the hurricane.

The hurricane moved westward due to a high pressure ridge while undergoing two eyewall replacement cycles: the first was around peak intensity and was completed when the hurricane moved over cooler waters, and the second was a brief cycle shortly after the hurricane began to weaken. The last advisory was issued while the hurricane was west of Mexico, but it was not until the remnants were west of Los Angeles, California that they finally dissipated. Elida's rapid intensification and unsteady weakening after reaching its peak intensity caused large errors in the intensity forecasting of the hurricane. Although the intensity forecasts were off, the track forecasts were better than usual compared to the ten-year period prior to that year.

Meteorological history 

Elida formed from a tropical wave that left the coast of Africa on July 13. The wave moved uneventfully through the Atlantic Ocean and the Caribbean Sea, emerging over the Pacific Ocean on July 21. The depression was predicted to move westward due to the presence of a ridge of high pressure which was also controlling the movement of Hurricane Douglas. Due to low shear and warm ocean waters, it was predicted that the depression would reach hurricane strength in 48 hours. The depression began rapid intensification while moving westward, and only six hours after being recognized as a depression, the system was upgraded to Tropical Storm Elida while displaying banding features and a central dense overcast. The forecast was revised, now predicting the storm to attain hurricane strength the next day.

The storm continued to rapidly intensify and gradually developed a banding eye feature and  infrared satellite images showed a possible eyewall in the central dense overcast. After six more hours, a small eye had formed and Elida was upgraded to a high-end Category 2 hurricane on the Saffir-Simpson Hurricane Scale with  winds on July 24, only eighteen hours after having first been initiated as a  tropical depression. Elida continued to rapidly strengthen, breaking the Dvorak estimates and reaching  six hours afterward, making it a Category 4 hurricane and resulting in a rare forecast for the hurricane to reach Category 5 intensity. Even though a later discussion mentioned that Elida had attained Category 5 status, it was not until the Tropical Cyclone Report that it was finally analyzed that Elida had maintained Category 5 strength for only six hours. At this time, Elida was observed to have formed concentric eyewalls, but it was not until the hurricane moved over cooler waters that the storm's eyewall replacement cycle was completed.

Afterward, the hurricane began to weaken in an irregular fashion. By this time, Elida had reached the edge of the ridge that kept the cyclone from turning northwest, and a turn to the northwest was beginning. The hurricane proceeded to undergo another eyewall replacement cycle, lowering its intensity to Category 2 intensity. Late on July 26, the eye disappeared from satellite. The weakening trend continued, and Elida weakened to a tropical storm on July 27. At this time, a weakness in the subtropical ridge allowed the storm to make a turn towards the north. Early on July 28, Elida began redeveloping, regaining moderate convection and possibly reintensifying, but eventually, the storm weakened back into a depression early on July 29. On the next day, Elida degenerated into a remnant low, and the last advisory was issued while an area of convection was displaced to the north of the center, with  seas in the area.

Impact 
Although the winds and rains associated with the storm remained far offshore, the Tropical Cyclone Report issued by the National Hurricane Center mentioned the likeliness that Elida caused swells and waves to hit the Mexican shore, but no reports of damage or casualties linked to Elida were ever received and no land advisories were ever needed for the hurricane.

While the track errors associated with forecasting the hurricane were lower than the errors in the period between 1992 and 2001, Elida's intensity proved to be hard to predict, leading to large errors in NHC forecasts. The errors in the forecast period except for the 72‑hour period were worse than the long-term average. The large errors in intensity forecasts were blamed on the rapid intensification of the hurricane to  winds and the unsteady weakening after reaching peak intensity.

When the MERIS sensor aboard the European Space Agency's satellite Envisat observed and recorded Hurricane Elida at peak intensity, it was the first time that the sensor had observed a hurricane. The sensor was originally designed primarily for recording oceanic biology and water quality as well as land vegetation, clouds, and water vapor.

See also 

 List of Pacific hurricanes
 List of Category 5 Pacific hurricanes

References 

2002 Pacific hurricane season
Category 5 Pacific hurricanes
Elida